Kireyevo is a rural locality (a selo) and the administrative center of Kireyevskoye Rural Settlement, Olkhovsky District, Volgograd Oblast, Russia. The population was 968 as of 2010. There are 23 streets.

Geography 
Kireyevo is located in steppe, on the Chertoleyka River, 21 km northwest of Olkhovka (the district's administrative centre) by road. Razuvayev is the nearest rural locality.

References 

Rural localities in Olkhovsky District